Und Jimmy ging zum Regenbogen (English: And Jimmy Went to the Rainbow's Foot ) is a movie by Alfred Vohrer based on the novel of the same name by Johannes Mario Simmel. It was filmed in Vienna and Munich in autumn 1970 and released in March 1971.

Plot
1969. In a Vienna bookshop the Argentine chemist Rafaelo Aranda is poisoned by the bookseller Valerie Steinfeld. The bookseller commits suicide immediately afterwards. It seems the bookseller has never met him before. The chemist's son, Manuel Aranda, wants to find out the background of this murder. He finds out that his father has developed chemical weapons of mass destruction and offered to sell them to the United States, the Soviet Union and France. The Secret Services of these countries try to prevent Aranda from publishing these facts. Aranda survives a first sniper attack without even noticing it.

Manuel Aranda learns that Valerie Steinfeld was involved in a risky paternity trial during the Third Reich. Her half-Jewish son was to be protected from the Nazis. Valerie Steinfeld had persuaded a friend to claim he was her son's father. The friend had no Jewish background and was a registered member of the Nazi Party. Slowly the suspicion arises that Steinfeld and Rafaelo Aranda might have had to do with each other at this time.

With the help of Irene Waldegg, the niece of Valerie Steinfeld, Manuel Aranda finds out about the Nazi past of his father. But Valerie Steinfeld also had her personal secret. Not even Irene Waldegg had known that she also was a part of Valerie Steinfeld's past.

Cast
 Alain Noury - Manuel Aranda
 Horst Tappert - Lawyer Forster
 Ruth Leuwerik - Valerie Steinfeld
 Konrad Georg - Martin Landau
 Horst Frank - Flemming
 Judy Winter - Nora Hill
 Doris Kunstmann - Irene Waldegg
 Heinz Moog - Hofrat Groll
 Eva Zilcher - Tilly Landau
 Heinz Baumann - Grant
 Herbert Fleischmann - Mercier
 Peter Pasetti - Santarin
 Friedrich G. Beckhaus - Dr. Gloggnigg
 Paul Edwin Roth - Direktor Friedjung
 Klaus Schwarzkopf - Sirius
 Jochen Brockmann - Dr. Stein
 Bruno Dallansky - Schäfer
 Karl Walter Diess - Carlsson
 Franz Elkins - Heinz Steinfeld
 Anita Buchegger
 Paul Glawion
 Mascha Gonska - Bianca
 Michael Janisch - Clairon
 Egon von Jordan
 Walter Regelsberger
 Robert Werner
 Herbert Kersten
 Elisabeth Stiepl
 Walter Varndal
 Ludwig Hirsch - bell boy

Literature
 Johannes Mario Simmel: The Caesar Code. Time Warner Publishing M/M (1986)

External links
 
 Und Jimmy ging zum Regenbogen at filmportal.de/en

References

1971 films
1970s spy drama films
1970s German-language films
German spy drama films
West German films
Films based on Austrian novels
Films set in Vienna
Films directed by Alfred Vohrer
1971 drama films
1970s German films